Gastrocoptidae is a family of minute, air-breathing land snails, terrestrial pulmonate gastropod molluscs in the superfamily Pupilloidea.

Distribution 
The distribution of the Gastrocoptidae is nearly worldwide, although family is extinct in Europe since Pleistocene, except one species in Northern Caucasus. In fossil record from Paleocene.

Taxonomy
For some time was considered as a subfamily in Vertiginidae, some species of these two families are very similar by the shell's characters.

Genera in the family Gastrocoptidae include:
 † Ptychalaea Boettger, 1889

Subfamily Gastrocoptinae Pilsbry, 1918
 Gastrocopta Wollaston, 1878 - the type genus of the family, distributed nearly worldwide, over 100 species, in fossil record from Paleocene, very numerous and speciose in the Miocene deposits of Europe
 Balticopta Balashov & Perkovsky, 2020 - fossil from Eocene Baltic amber
 Cavipupa Pilsbry, 1934 - endemic to Philippines
 Chaenaxis Pilsbry & Ferris, 1906 - North America
 Gibbulina Beck, 1837
 Ptychalaea Boettger, 1889 - fossil from Miocene and Eocene of Europe
 Pumilicopta  Solem, 1988 - Australia
 Ulpia Hylton Scott, 1955

Subfamily Hypselostomatinae Zilch, 1959 - distributed mainly in Southeastern Asia and Australia
 Hypselostoma Benson, 1856 - the type genus of the subfamily
 Acinolaemus Thompson & Upatham, 1997
 Anauchen Pilsbry, 1917
 Angustopila Jochum, Slapnik & Páll-Gergely, 2014
 Antroapiculus Panha & Burch, 1999
 Aulacospira Möllendorff, 1890
 Bensonella Pilsbry & Vanatta, 1900
 Boysia L. Pfeiffer, 1849
 Boysidia Ancey, 1881
 Clostophis Benson, 1860
 Dentisphaera Páll-Gergely & Jochum, 2017 - endemic to the caves in Northern Vietnam
 Gyliotrachela Tomlin, 1930
 Krobylos Panha & Burch, 1999
 Montapiculus Panha & Burch, 1999
 Pseudostreptaxis Möllendorff, 1890
 Tonkinospira Jochum, Slapnik & Páll-Gergely, 2014
 Paraboysidia Pilsbry, 1917

References

Literature
 Pilsbry H.A. 1916–1918. Manual of Conchology. Second Series: Pulmonata, 24. Pupillidae (Gastrocoptinae). Philadelphia: Academy of Natural Sciences of Philadelphia. 380 p.
 Pilsbry H.A., Cooke C.M. 1918–1920. Manual of Conchology. Second Series: Pulmonata, 25. Pupillidae (Gastrocoptinae, Vertigininae). Academy of Natural Sciences of Philadelphia. Philadelphia. 401 pp.
 Schileyko A.A. 1998. Treatise on Recent Terrestrial Pulmonate Molluscs. Part 2: Gastrocoptidae, Hypselostomatidae, Vertiginidae, Truncatellinidae, Pachnodidae, Enidae, Sagdidae // Ruthenica. Suppl.2. P.129–261.

Links
 MolluscaBase - Gastrocoptidae

 
Stylommatophora